Anthony Russell Bean (born 1957) is an Australian botanist who works at the Queensland Herbarium and Brisbane Botanic Gardens, Mount Coot-tha. Since 1982, he has led the Eucalyptus Study Group of the Society for Growing Australian Plants.

Career
From at least 1989, he was working at CSIRO, Division of Plant Industry, in Nambour, Queensland, and much of that work was on Eucalypts.

In later years he has contributed to the history of Australian botany, with work on Ludwig Leichhardt, Frederick Kenny,  and Cyril Tenison White,

Names published 
IPNI lists 343 names published by Bean. Examples are:

 Alphitonia pomaderroides (Fenzl) A.R.Bean.
 Eucalyptus exilipes M.I.H. Brooker & A.R. Bean

References

External links

1957 births
20th-century Australian botanists
Living people
Place of birth missing (living people)
21st-century Australian botanists